Ordnance Corps may refer to:

Royal Australian Army Ordnance Corps, the Corps within the Australian Army concerned with explosives and salvage of battle-damaged equipment
Royal Canadian Ordnance Corps, an administrative corps of the Canadian Army
Army Ordnance Corps (India), Indian Army formation providing material and logistical support to the Indian Army during war and peace
Ordnance Corps (Ireland), combat support corps of the Irish Army
Ordnance Corps (Israel), a combat-support corps in the IDF GOC Army Headquarters
Pakistan Army Ordnance Corps, a material and logistic support crops of the Pakistan Army
Royal New Zealand Army Ordnance Corps (New Zealand), a former corps of the New Zealand Army
Sri Lanka Army Ordnance Corps, a combat support corps of the Sri Lanka Army
Swedish Army Ordnance Corps, a former administrative corps of the Swedish Army
Royal Army Ordnance Corps (United Kingdom), a former corps of the British Army
United States Army Ordnance Corps, a Sustainment branch of the United States Army, headquartered at Fort Lee, Virginia